Jason Lawrence Geiger (born September 17, 1974), professionally known as Austin St. John, is an American actor, martial artist, and paramedic best known for his portrayal of Jason Lee Scott in the Power Rangers franchise.

Early life
Austin St. John was born on September 17, 1974, in Roswell, New Mexico, and is the son of U.S. Marine and martial artist Steve John and his wife, Sharon. He has one sibling, a brother named Stephen. With a parent in the armed forces, St. John lived all over the United States while growing up.

Career 
Austin St. John's first acting role and most well-known role to date came to him when he was 19 years old, when he was cast as teen superhero Jason Lee Scott, the Red Power Ranger in Mighty Morphin Power Rangers, the first installment of the Power Rangers franchise, which debuted on Fox Kids in 1993. For his role, he took the stage name Austin St. John, Austin coming from The Six Million Dollar Man'''s Steve Austin and St. John being a name of his own choosing. 

Like St. John, his character had a background in martial arts. Though the series was hugely successful and brought St. John international recognition as an actor, long hours on set combined with low pay and no union recognition presented real challenges for him. As a result, St. John, along with all of his other co-stars including Jason David Frank agreed to leave the show during its second season if their employers rejected their pay demands and unionization attempts, but when time came, only Walter Emanuel Jones and Thuy Trang joined him in the ultimatum and they stopped showing up to set as a form of a strike. They were let go and replaced. St. John was replaced by Steve Cardenas as the Red Ranger. 

St. John went onto reprise the role of Jason several times over, in both film and television, including a temporary role in Power Rangers Zeo as he needed money for his mothers surgery and was not willing to look for new employment. Saban agreed to hire him back to help him out and the brother of Jason David Frank who was supposed to be the Gold Ranger was let go. He was also in the Turbo movie returning with Amy Jo Johnson. He also made an appearance as the character in 2002, in an episode of Power Rangers Wild Force entitled “Forever Red”. He also appeared alongside Jones, as himself, in the Power Rangers special The Lost Episode in 1999, which focused on the history of the franchise up to that point and showed the original pilot episode for the series, which had never before been aired. 

In 2017, he made a cameo in the movie Surge of Power: Revenge of the Sequel. In 2018, he was acting in the television movie Monsters At Large and had a major role in the 2019 dramatic movie A Walk with Grace.

In 2020, St. John reprised the role of Jason in a second season episode of Power Rangers Beast Morphers titled "Grid Connection". He said that Hasbro made him shave his beard and he was unhappy as shaving made his head look bigger. He later said after his arrest and his passport being suspended that he wouldn't return to Power Rangers again in the future. It is unknown if the reason was because of having to shave or if he was attempting to make an excuse because of his passport being suspended and him not wanting to admit it. 

In 2022, he had the lead role in the film Tres Leches, directed by John Schneider. The film is available for free on the official Youtube channel of John Schneider. Tres Leches film official on Youtube.com
 Other ventures 
Austin St. John began as a proficient martial artist, holding a second-degree black belt in Taekwondo, a first-degree black belt in Judo and a first-degree black belt in Kenpo and for a time, he worked as a martial arts instructor. Additionally, he published a book on the subject, Karate Warrior: A Beginner's Guide to Martial Arts'', in 1996.

Personal life
Austin St. John attended Robert Frost Middle School and W.T. Woodson High School in Fairfax, VA, before moving to Fullerton, California, where he attended Sunny Hills High School, but did not graduate. As an adult, he went on to earn his G.E.D. and ultimately obtained his undergraduate degree from Concordia University. For over a decade, he worked as a paramedic in the Washington, D.C. area. He also worked with the U.S. military as a healthcare provider in the Middle East for several years, though he was not actually a member of any branch of the armed forces. He has two sons and a daughter.

In May 2022, he was indicted on federal fraud charges related to the CARES Act. He conspired in a $3.5 million scheme to create businesses or use an existing business to submit applications to fraudulently obtain Paycheck Protection Program funding. This was after being declined the loan. Prosecutors said participants in the conspiracy would file false supporting documentation and misrepresent key details, including the number of their employees and the amount of their payroll, causing the Small Business Administration and financial institutions to issue loans. Prosecutors allege St. John and co-defendants paid the ringleaders of the scheme, and spent the money on personal purchases. Among items purchased, Austin bought himself a personal motorcycle. If convicted, he could face up to 20 years in prison. Possibly 40 as President Biden has said it would be double the time. His trial was to begin late February. His constant booking for comic con appearances is delaying the trial and the final verdict may not take place until late 2023/ Early 2024. 

Since the incident, St. John agreed to be put on probation and his movements were restricted within his home state of Texas. However as his occupation requires him to travel across the country, the court granted him permission to do so under legal supervision within his submitted itinerary, which included his previously scheduled convention appearances. Austin must get permission to leave his home state for any occasion due to his pending charges. On May 25, 2022, St. John released a video confirming these recent events as true and reiterated his legal inability to discuss said events at his entertainment-based public appearances.

Filmography

Film

Television

Video games

References

External links

 

1974 births
20th-century American male actors
21st-century American male actors
American male film actors
American male judoka
American male taekwondo practitioners
Kenpō
American male television actors
Combat medics
Concordia University alumni
Living people
Male actors from New Mexico
Male actors from Washington, D.C.
People from Roswell, New Mexico